Phillip Ryan Jenkins (January 26, 1987) is an American college baseball coach and former catcher. Jenkins is the head coach of the UT Martin Skyhawks baseball team.

Amateur career
Jenkins attended Stanhope Elmore High School in Millbrook, Alabama. As a junior, Jenkins was named 5A All-State as a utility player. Jenkins then committed to Auburn University, where he was a member of the Auburn Tigers baseball team.

Professional career
Jenkins was drafted in the 17th round of the 2010 Major League Baseball draft by the Kansas City Royals. Jenkins played parts of three seasons in Kansas City's farm system. Although he was assigned to the Triple-A Omaha Storm Chasers for a week in August 2011, Jenkins never played a game above Double-A.

Coaching career
On August 24, 2016, Jenkins was named an assistant coach at the College of Charleston.
On December 11, 2017, Jenkins was named the interim head coach of the Skyhawks. On April 17, 2018, he was promoted to the full-time head coach.

Head coaching record

See also
 List of current NCAA Division I baseball coaches

References

External links

UT Martin Skyhawks bio

Living people
1987 births
Baseball catchers
Auburn Tigers baseball players
Burlington Royals players
Kane County Cougars players
Arizona League Royals players
Idaho Falls Chukars players
Northwest Arkansas Naturals players
Auburn Tigers baseball coaches
College of Charleston Cougars baseball coaches
UT Martin Skyhawks baseball coaches